The Labour Panel is one of five vocational panels which together elect 43 of the 60 members of Seanad Éireann, the upper house of the Oireachtas (the legislature of Ireland). The Labour Panel elects eleven senators.

Election
Article 18 of the Constitution of Ireland provides that 43 of the 60 senators are to be elected from five vocational panels. The Labour Panel is defined in Article 18.7.1º (iii) as "Labour, whether organised or unorganised". The Seanad returning officer maintains a list of nominating bodies for each of the five panels. Candidates may be nominated either by four members of the Oireachtas or by a nominating body. The electorate consists of city and county councillors and current members of the Oireachtas. As the Seanad election takes place after the election to the Dáil, the Oireachtas members are the members of the incoming Dáil and the outgoing Seanad. Eleven senators are elected on the Labour Panel, at least four of whom must have been nominated by Oireachtas members and at least four must have been nominated by nominating bodies.

Senators

Notes

List of nominating bodies
The following bodies are on the register of nominating bodies maintained by the Seanad Returning Officer for the Labour Panel:
 Irish Conference of Professional and Service Associations
 Irish Congress of Trade Unions

References

Seanad constituencies